Edward Bickersteth is the name of four members of an English ecclesiastical family:

Edward Bickersteth (priest) (1786–1850), English evangelical priest
Edward Bickersteth (Dean of Lichfield) (1814–1892), English Anglican priest, nephew of the evangelical priest
Edward Bickersteth (bishop of Exeter) (1825–1906), English Anglican bishop, son of the evangelical priest
Edward Bickersteth (bishop of South Tokyo) (1850–1897), English Anglican bishop, son of the Bishop of Exeter